Space Goofs is a French animated series that was produced by Gaumont Multimedia for its first season and Xilam for its second season, produced for France 3, and broadcast on that network from September 6, 1997 to May 12, 2006. It also debuted in the same year in Germany on ProSieben, and aired in Canada on Teletoon. In the UK, the first season premiered on Channel 4 in 1998 under the show's original title of Home to Rent and the second season premiered under the series' final name on Nicktoons UK on November 5, 2005 at 9:30am. Furthermore, it aired as part of the Fox Kids lineup on Fox in the United States.

The series also served as the basis of an adventure game, developed by Xilam themselves and published by Ubisoft for Microsoft Windows and Sega Dreamcast called Stupid Invaders in 2000 – which was dedicated to its co-creator, Jean-Yves Raimbaud. In contrast to the original show, it featured plenty of toilet humor and slightly more adult content. It also was the first work produced by Xilam to be made for an older audience - the other being the adult animated movie, I Lost My Body.

Plot
Five extraterrestrials from the fictitious planet Zigma B, Candy H. Caramella, Etno Polino, Bud Budiovitch, Gorgious Klatoo and Stereo Monovici go on a picnic together in space. However, their spaceship crashes into an asteroid, and they fall to planet Earth. They realize that if any human finds out that they are aliens, they could be captured and experimented on by scientists, so they take shelter in the attic of a house that is up for rent.

The aliens have two goals: return to their home planet, and chase away anybody who tries to establish themselves in the house. To remain unknown from humans, the aliens use a device called the SMTV that lets them transform into almost any entity of their choosing, but always cycles through three other unrelated transformations (as a running gag) when used.

In the second season, Stereo is now no longer part of the main cast, with said character only being bought back for one episode. An explanation was provided where Stereo has somehow managed to get back to Zigma B, so Candy, Etno, Bud and Gorgious continue to find a way back home.

Characters

Candy H. Caramella
 Voiced by (French): Eric Le Roch (season 1), Éric Métayer (season 2)
 Voiced by (English): Charlie Adler
 Small and green with a wrinkled forehead and wearing a polka-dotted apron, Candy is the uptight neat freak of the group. He is homosexual (often disguising himself as a woman), and it is not uncommon to see him flirt with men. He was changed to a female in the Latin American Spanish dub, but considers a sex change entirely in Stupid Invaders. In both the original French version and the English dub, Candy's voice parodies a fancy English accent.

Etno Polino
 Voiced by (French): Peter Hudson (season 1), Bernard Alane (season 2)
 Voiced by (English): Maurice LaMarche
 Being short and purple with red lips and a big nose, Etno is the leader and brains of the group. A scientific genius, he creates all sorts of machines with the intention of aiding the group's return to their own planet, including rockets. The aliens often fail to blast off into space, either due to Etno's rockets malfunctioning or someone else boarding the ships. In the original French dub, he speaks with an English accent, but in the English dub, he has a rather fast-paced manner of speech, vaguely reminiscent of those found in educational films about space exploration from the 1950s.

Bud Budiovitch
 Voiced by (French): Marc Brettonière (season 1), Éric Métayer (season 2)
 Voiced by (English): Jeff Bennett (season 1), James Louis Gomez-Garneau (season 2)
 Tall and orange with three strands of hair, a long neck, and big pink bloodshot eyes, Bud is lazy and naive. He is a television addict and spends most of the time sitting in front of it and drinking soft drinks. Like Etno, Bud is always the last one to panic in a situation. He always comes up with the best solution, but most of the time no one will listen to him.

Gorgious Klatoo
 Voiced by (French): Patrick Préjean
 Voiced by (English): Michael Sicoly (earlier episodes), Danny Mann (onward)
 Fat and blue with a heavy chin and a protruding bottom tooth,  is the grumpy and brutal one of the group. He is very greedy and his hobbies consist of bullying the other aliens and eating.

Stereo Monovici
 Voiced by (French): Antoine Tomé (season 1), Patrick Guillemin (season 2)
 Voiced by (English): Jeff Bennett (season 1), Danny Mann (season 2)
 Two-headed and red in which each head has a slightly long nose, Stereo acts as two people since each head has its own mind. They are the "bookworm" of the group yet often waste their intelligence on the most useless information. Both heads often argue with each other. Stereo was removed from the series for Season 2, but reappeared in two segments of that season ("Other World Champs" and "UFO"). One of the heads also speaks with a distinct, high-pitched voice, while the other head speaks with a rather low-pitched one.

Every episode will feature a new visitor, a la a "villain of the week" formula, who will come to the presumed "vacant" home. These visitors come in a weird variety of characters (mostly humans but sometimes can be Pigs, Birds, & other animals & aliens.) While the credits do not specify who, additional voices include:
Jim Cummings - Slick Stagger
Billy West
Carlos Alazraqui
Rob Paulsen
Kevin Michael Richardson
Tom Kenny
Laraine Newman
Frank Welker
Kath Soucie
Grey DeLisle
Tara Strong

Episodes

Series overview

Season 1 (1997–1998)
All episodes in this season were directed by Thomas Szabó.

Season 2 (2005–2006)
All episodes in this season were directed by Olivier Jean-Marie.

Stupid Invaders

An adventure game based on Space Goofs named Stupid Invaders was released in 2000–2001 by Ubisoft. It featured crew members from its first season and the voice actors of its English dub as the five aliens, having to go back home in a surreal world, after an infiltration by a bounty hunter named Bolok (voiced by Billy West).

In other media

A film adaptation for the show titled Stupid Invaders was planned, but was never released for reasons unknown, beyond a short preview posted online. It was a CGI-animated adaptation of the show, where the four aliens (Etno, Candy, Gorgious and Bud) have ended up accidentally crash landing into someone else's house. Said house is revealed to be inhabited by an unnamed brunette girl, who gets curious upon her sight of the aliens.

References in other Xilam properties 
While a revival had never been considered, the main characters make several cameos in some of Xilam's other TV shows. It should be noted most of these references took place in the 2000's, when season 2 was still airing.
In Oggy and the Cockroaches:
 In earlier seasons, Oggy's house has a framed picture of the first season's main cast of aliens. These were removed in the remade episodes.
 A miniature version of the house for rent is seen and utilized in the episode "Baby Doll" (from its first season).
 The characters also made a cameo in the episode "Night Watchmen" (from its third season), where the titular characters end up transforming into the four aliens in the washing machine, as a gag, in one scene.
In Shuriken School: The Ninja's Secret, a picture of Candy is on the cover of Jimmy B.'s manga, Star Attacks, a parody of the Star Wars franchise.
In the film, Go West! A Lucky Luke Adventure, a scene featuring Roger and the cockroaches (Joey, Dee Dee and Marky, from Oggy) has him mention "monster men", which may be a reference to the show's theme. 
In The Daltons episode "Le Secret Passage", Candy was one of Joe's transformations in Fort Dalton.

References

External links
 Official website
Stupid Invaders official website

1997 French television series debuts
1990s French animated television series
2006 French television series endings
2000s French animated television series
Animated television series about extraterrestrial life
Fox Kids
French-language television shows
French children's animated comic science fiction television series
ProSieben original programming
Television series about shapeshifting
Television shows adapted into video games
Xilam
YTV (Canadian TV channel) original programming